State Road 464 (NM 464) is a  state highway in the US state of New Mexico. NM 464's southern terminus is at U.S. Route 70 (US 70) north-northwest of Lordsburg, and the northern terminus is a continuation as Conner Road at the end of state maintenance in Redrock.

Major intersections

See also

References

464
Transportation in Hidalgo County, New Mexico
Transportation in Grant County, New Mexico